Christian Nilsson (born December 31, 1987) is an American film director and screenwriter. He is best known for the psychological thriller Dashcam (2021) and his short Unsubscribe (2020), a 29-minute horror film that topped the U.S. box office in June 2020 after Nilsson and YouTuber Eric Tabach exploited a loophole during the COVID-19 pandemic.

Career

Digital Media 
Nilsson's career began in digital media where he worked as a video journalist for various outlets like The Huffington Post, Esquire, BuzzFeed, MTV, VH1, and The Atlantic. For his work, he was awarded a 2019 Silver Telly Award for the BuzzFeed produced short documentary I Found A Roll Of Undeveloped Film From 1964 and a 2017 NY Emmy Award for his HuffPost produced short documentary The Fight To Be The Oldest Bar In NYC.

Unsubscribe 
In May 2020, YouTuber Eric Tabach called Nilsson to ask how he could potentially get one of his own YouTube videos to become the number one film in the U.S. box office. Nilsson explained "four-walling", the distribution technique where a filmmaker rents out an entire theater which allows them to keep all the profits. Because theaters were closed due to the COVID-19 pandemic, Nilsson predicted they'd be able to rent out a closed theater for very little money, buy every ticket themselves for several showings, then keep the profits—essentially, breaking even.

Nilsson wrote the script for Unsubscribe in one day, and filming began the next day with Tabach's friends and fellow YouTubers including Charlie Tahan (Ozark, I Am Legend), Michelle Khare (HBO Max's Karma), Zach Kornfeld (Try Guys), and Thomas Brag (Yes Theory). A majority of the film was shot over Zoom in just three days

The film follows five YouTubers who hold a video-call for their friend's birthday only to find themselves hunted and haunted by an internet troll.

On June 20, 2020, Nilsson and Tabach premiered the film at the Westhampton Beach Performing Arts Center in Westhampton Beach, NY. They bought out five showings and racked up $25,488 in ticket sales. The following day, the film was listed on Box Office Mojo and The Numbers as the number one film in the U.S. box office.

The film garnered mostly positive reviews for its creation process and ability to gain high rankings during the COVID-19 pandemic. The Washington Post praised the film as "a testament to artistic ingenuity under lockdown", while NME called the film an "entertaining hoax", and Fox News opined that "garnering a No. 1 release – albeit short-lived since "Unsubscribe" failed to throw off weekend box office numbers – is a stout accomplishment in itself". Other sources were more ambivalent, such as Decider, which stated that "[w]hether this stunt is a stroke of brilliance or a stroke of shameless self-promotion is up to you", while Trillmag said that "Unsubscribe's status as a historical filmmaking achievement is indicated by the unorthodox (and deviously scheming) method through which it achieved box office success"

Dashcam 
In December 2020, Deadline Hollywood announced Nilsson and Tabach partnered with production companies Kamikaze Dogfight and Hood River Entertainment to finance Nilsson's feature-length directorial debut, Dashcam. The psychological thriller stars Tabach with Giorgia Whigham, Larry Fessenden, Zachary Booth, Guillian Gioiello and Noa Fisher in supporting roles.

Dashcam world premiered virtually at Popcorn Frights Film Festival in Miami, Florida in August 2021 and was released by Gravitas Ventures in the US on October 19, 2021. The film was included on the New York Times list of "Five Horror Films To Stream" for November 2021 and wrote the film is "at its creepiest when just audio and video clips, and Jake's surgical adjustments to them, steer the paranoia-driven story. Over 82 unnerving minutes, Nilsson squeezes big suspense out of seemingly throwaway moments, as when Jake just sits and listens to audio tracks."

On review aggregator Rotten Tomatoes, the film holds an approval rating of 89%. One top critic wrote, "Dashcam is an extraordinary low-budget political thriller that does a lot with a little, and is a masterclass that sometimes, having the guts to punch above its weight can pay off just through sheer audacity alone." Another wrote, "Working with miniscule [sic] budget, writer/director Christian Nilsson upstages his better-financed moneyed counterparts with this gripping political thriller."

Filmography

Personal life 
Nilsson married Stephanie Hains on October 10th, 2020.

References 

American film directors

1987 births
Living people
Film directors from New York City